Ludovic Kashindi (born June 6, 1984 in Paris, France) is a former professional Canadian football defensive back. He was originally signed by the Hamilton Tiger-Cats in September 2010, before being signed to a practice roster agreement with the Roughriders in October of that year. He played CIS football for the Sherbrooke Vert et Or.

References

External links
Saskatchewan Roughriders bio

1984 births
Living people
Canadian football defensive backs
Edmonton Elks players
Hamilton Tiger-Cats players
Saskatchewan Roughriders players
Sherbrooke Vert et Or football players